Synthetic magnesium silicates are white, odorless, finely divided powders formed by the precipitation reaction of water-soluble sodium silicate (water glass) and a water-soluble magnesium salt such as magnesium chloride, magnesium nitrate or magnesium sulfate.  The composition of the precipitate depends on the ratio of the components in the reaction medium, the addition of the correcting substances, and the way in which they are precipitated.

The molecular formula is typically written as MgO:XSiO2, where X denotes the average mole ratio of SiO2 to MgO.  The product is hydrated and the formula is sometimes written MgO:XSiO2•H2O to show the water of hydration.

Properties
Unlike natural magnesium silicates like talc and forsterite olivine which are crystalline, synthetic magnesium silicates are amorphous.  Synthetic magnesium silicates are insoluble in water or alcohol.  The particles are usually porous, and the BET surface area can range from less than 100 m2/g to several hundred m2/g.

Applications
The very large active surface makes synthetic magnesium silicate useful for a wide variety of applications: purifying adsorbent (polyols, animal and vegetable oils, chromatography, dry cleaning, sugar, resins, odors); filler (rubber, ceramics, paper, glass, refractories); anti-caking agent (salt); catalyst; catalyst carrier; filter medium.

In food 
The U.S. Food Chemicals Codex, JECFA, and other monographs for Food Grade synthetic magnesium silicate specify a mole ratio of 2MgO:5SiO2 (or X=2.5 in the general formula).  The most common use for Food Grade synthetic magnesium silicate is as an active filter aid for adsorption of color, free fatty acids and other polar compounds from used frying oils.  Various national and international regulations allow use of this material as an anti-caking agent in a wide variety of powdered foods.

When used as a food additive, it is safe to ingest synthetic magnesium silicate.  In 1990, the safety of synthetic magnesium silicate was reviewed by the Scientific Committee on Food (SCF) together with that of silica and the other metal alkali silicates.  The SCF noted that “the available data, including a number of short-term studies in two species, appear to substantiate the biological inertness of those compounds”.  The SCF established a group Acceptable Daily Intake (ADI) not specified for silicon dioxide and the alkali metal silicates.

See also 
 Talc, a natural magnesium silicate
 Diatomaceous earth, a natural silicon-based filter material

References 

Silicon